The Last Gunfighter Ballad is the 55th album by American country singer Johnny Cash, released on Columbia Records in 1977. Highlights include the title track, "Far Side Banks of Jordan" and "That Silver Haired Daddy of Mine", the latter of which features Cash's brother Tommy Cash. The title track was the album's only single, reaching #38 on the country charts; it tells the tale of an aging gunslinger who finds himself unable to deal with the modern way of life.

"Ballad of Barbara" is a new recording of a song that had first appeared as the B-side of Cash's 1973 single "Praise the Lord and Pass the Soup", while "City Jail" is a studio version of a track first released on the live album På Österåker. "Far Side Banks of Jordan", a duet featuring Cash and his wife, June Carter Cash, is a remake of a track first recorded in 1975 for a planned Gospel album that was recorded in full, but for reasons unknown was never released (the 1975 version of the song, along with the other tracks, would not be released until 2012). The song is noted for its lyrics which feature June pondering the possibility of dying before her husband (she would in fact die several months before Cash in 2003).

Track listing

Personnel
Johnny Cash - vocals
 Bob Wootton, Jerry Hensley, Jack Routh - guitar
 Marshall Grant, Roy Goin, Mike Leech - bass
 WS Holland - drums
 Larry McCoy, Earl Poole Ball - piano
 Farrell Morris - percussion
Tommy Cash - vocals
June Carter Cash - vocals
The Carter Family and Jan Howard - vocals

Additional personnel

Produced by: Charlie Bragg and Don Davis
Arranged by: Bill Walker
Recorded at Sound Spectrum Recording, Inc. (House of Cash Studios)
Engineers: Charlie Bragg, Roger Tucker, Danny Jones, Chuck Bragg
Photography: Bill Barnes
Liner Notes: Johnny Cash (as John D. (Deadeye) Cash)

Charts
Album - Billboard (United States)

Singles - Billboard (United States)

References

External links
 Luma Electronic entry on The Last Gunfighter Ballad

Johnny Cash albums
1977 albums
Columbia Records albums